is a Japanese boys' love (BL) manga series by Yuu Toyota.

A live-action television drama adaptation began airing on October 9, 2020, as part of TV Tokyo's  programming block, which enjoyed high ratings during its broadcast. A sequel to the television drama was later released as a live-action film on April 8, 2022.

Plot
Having never had sex in his life, after Kiyoshi Adachi reaches his 30th birthday he becomes a "": he develops an ability to hear the thoughts of other people by touching them. One day, he discovers that his popular co-worker, Yuichi Kurosawa, is in love with him. While dealing with the awkwardness of being able to hear Kurosawa's rather forthright feelings towards him, Adachi comes to terms with how much Kurosawa values him and starts to develop reciprocal feelings of his own.

Characters

 (drama CD); portrayed by: Eiji Akaso (TV drama)
Adachi is a salaryman who, after reaching his 30th birthday as a virgin, develops an ability to read the minds of people he touches. Toyota described Adachi as "serious and straightforward" while also having a rough life because he lacks self-confidence. Toyota also states that he is starting to change because of his relationship with Kurosawa. 

 (drama CD); portrayed by: Keita Machida (TV drama)
Kurosawa is a salaryman working at the same company as Adachi. He is friendly and his good looks makes him popular in the office, but he is also secretly in love with Adachi and often fantasizes about him. Toyota described Kurosawa as being "handsome" but being a "mess" on the inside at the same time, while also having pure feelings of love for Adachi.

 (drama CD); portrayed by: Kodai Asaka (TV drama)
Tsuge is Adachi's friend from college who is a romance novelist. Like Adachi, he reaches his 30s as a virgin and is able to read the minds of people he touches. He owns a cat named Udon which he rescued from abandonment. He develops feelings for Minato.

 (drama CD); portrayed by: Yutaro (TV drama)
Minato is a deliveryman assigned to Tsuge's neighborhood. Though wary of Tsuge, he is attached to his cat, Udon, which he had wanted to adopt but couldn't.

Portrayed by: Takuya Kusakawa (TV drama)
Rokkaku is Adachi's co-worker.

Portrayed by: Ryo Sato (TV drama)
Fujisaki is Adachi's co-worker.

Portrayed by: Suzunosuke (TV drama)
Urabe is Adachi's co-worker.

Development

Cherry Magic! Thirty Years of Virginity Can Make You a Wizard?! originated as a 4-page comic that Yuu Toyota posted on her Twitter and Pixiv accounts in January 2018. Toyota conceptualized the story seven or eight years prior by imagining what kind of power would be best for someone who has little experience in love, as well as the legend where one will gain magical powers if they stay a virgin past 30 years old. Toyota stated that initially, the main couple was supposed to be similar to Tsuge and Minato, but she felt it was more interesting if the person with the magical powers was the one being pursued. Adachi was created from the idea of a person who has little experience in love and lacking self-confidence, while Kurosawa was created as his foil. Toyota also stated that she has not specified who has the role of the top or bottom in Adachi and Kurosawa's relationship.

Toyota also intended for the theme of Cherry Magic! was to show how, even if one has magical powers, self-confidence is necessary for progress. An hour after it was posted, Ito, an editor who had been following her work for some time, offered her a publishing deal through Twitter. Ito also arranged for Kawai to be Toyota's editor as well. Toyota, Ito, and Kawai noted that Cherry Magic! had a diverse audience, including men and elementary school students. Because of this, Toyota included a disclaimer in Cherry Magic! stating that there may be "adult" developments later in the story, though there were no plans of drawing anything explicit.

Media

Manga
Cherry Magic! Thirty Years of Virginity Can Make You a Wizard?! is written and illustrated by Yuu Toyota. It is serialized digitally on Gangan Pixiv since September 1, 2018. The chapters were later released in eleven bound volumes by Square Enix.

A drama CD adaptation was released on October 23, 2019, starring Atsushi Abe as Adachi, Takuya Satō as Kurosawa, Kazuyuki Okitsu as Tsuge, and Kōhei Amasaki as Minato. The drama CD is narrated by Kentarō Tone.

At Anime Expo 2019, Square Enix announced that they were distributing the series in English in 2020 as their first boys' love series.

Television drama
A live-action television series adaptation was announced in September 2020 and began airing on October 9, 2020. The series stars Eiji Akaso as Adachi and Keita Machida as Kurosawa. Additional cast members include Kodai Asaka, Yutaro, Takuya Kusakawa, Ryo Sato, and Suzunosuke. The television series aired weekly on TV Tokyo at 1 AM as part of their  programming block and is also distributed through Tsutaya's online streaming service. The opening theme song is "Ubugoe" by Omoinotake and the ending theme is "Good Love Your Love" by Deep Squad. On December 24, Tsutaya is releasing two exclusive episodes through their streaming service.

Yuu Toyota initially was unsure that Eiji Akaso could portray Adachi's "nerdy" personality well, but she was later impressed when he got into character. For the drama adaptation, she specifically instructed the production not to use derogatory language towards the  genre or virgins.

In December 2020, Crunchyroll announced that they had licensed the show in English for distribution outside of Asia.

Episodes

Film
A live-action film adaptation was released in theaters nationwide in Japan on April 8, 2022. The film is a sequel to the live-action television series, with the cast returning to reprise their roles. The film's theme song is "Shinon" by Omoinotake, with the insert song "Gimme Gimme" performed by Deep Squad.

The film debuted at #6 on its opening weekend. Yuu Toyota, the author of the original manga, donated a portion of the adaptation rights fee to Marriage for All Japan, an organization advocating for same-sex marriage in Japan.

Other adaptations

In November 2022, a Thai television drama adaptation was green-lit. It will be directed by Nuttapong Mongkolsawas and star Tawan Vihokratana  and Thitipoom Techaapaikhun.

Reception
Rebecca Silverman from Anime News Network complimented the story, humor, and romance, but mentioned that the plot could get too "convoluted" and was too tame for its mature rating. Faye Hopper from Anime News Network stated that while the romance was "cute", there were some concerns over humor regarding Kurosawa's explicit fantasies about Adachi. Volume 2 was the 7th best-selling manga on its week of release at Tsutaya.

In a weekly survey for the Drama Satisfaction Ranking, the live-action television drama adaptation received 27/100 points for its first episode, 63/100 points for the second episode, and 79/100 points for the third episode. By the fourth episode, it received 86/100 points, making it the second highest ranked television series for the week. The seventh and eighth episodes both scored 87/100 points while the ninth episode scored 89/100, with all three being the highest ranked in their respective weeks. The tenth episode scored 90/100 points and was the highest ranked in its week.

Notes

References

External links
  of TV drama at TV Tokyo 
 
 

2010s LGBT literature
2020 Japanese television series debuts
2020s Japanese LGBT-related television series
Boys' love films
Gangan Comics manga
Japanese LGBT-related drama television series
Japanese boys' love television series
Japanese television dramas based on manga
LGBT in anime and manga
LGBT literature in Japan
TV Tokyo original programming
Yaoi anime and manga